Georgios Apostolidis (alternate spelling: Giorgos) (Greek: Γιώργος Αποστολίδης; born June 22, 1984) is a Greek professional basketball player. He is 2.00 m (6 ft 6  in) tall. He can play at the point guard, shooting guard, point forward, and small forward positions.

Professional career
Apostolidis has played with clubs such as: PAOK, Iraklis, Olympia Larissa, Panellinios, AEL 1964 GS, Trikala 2000, Ilysiakos, and Panathinaikos in his professional career. Apostolidis signed with Olympiacos Piraeus, in July 2007, and he was loaned to Panellinios  In October 2014, he signed a contract with Doxa Lefkadas. He appeared in 23 games for the team, averaging 11.9 points, 4.3 rebounds, 3.3 assists, and 1.5 steals per game, in 30.4 minutes per game. 

In September 2015, Apostolidis signed with Iraklis Thessaloniki of the Greek 2nd Division.

National team career
Apostolidis was a member of the Greek junior national teams. He won the bronze medal at the 2002 FIBA Europe Under-18 Championship, the bronze medal at the 2003 FIBA Under-19 World Championship, and the silver medal at the 2005 FIBA Under-21 World Championship. He also played at the 2004 FIBA Europe Under-20 Championship.

Awards and honors

Club career
Greek League Champion: (2014)
Greek Cup Winner: (2014)

References

External links
Euroleague.net Profile
FIBA Profile
FIBA Europe Profile
Eurobasket.com Profile
Greek Basket League Profile 

1984 births
Living people
A.E.L. 1964 B.C. players
Apollon Patras B.C. players
Doxa Lefkadas B.C. players
Greek men's basketball players
Holargos B.C. players
Ilysiakos B.C. players
Iraklis Thessaloniki B.C. players
Olympia Larissa B.C. players
Panellinios B.C. players
P.A.O.K. BC players
Point guards
Shooting guards
Small forwards
Basketball players from Thessaloniki
Trikala B.C. players